José Ibañez Gómez (born September 28, 1951) is a retired competitive judoka from Cuba, who represented his native country at two consecutive Summer Olympics, starting in 1972 in Munich, West Germany, where he was defeated by Canadian Terry Farnsworth, and came in 13th. He won the silver medal at the 1975 Pan American Games in the men's heavyweight division (+ 93 kg), after a loss in the final against USA's Allen Coage. In total he gained four medals in his career at the Pan American Games.

References

 

1951 births
Living people
Judoka at the 1972 Summer Olympics
Judoka at the 1976 Summer Olympics
Olympic judoka of Cuba
Place of birth missing (living people)
Cuban male judoka
Pan American Games gold medalists for Cuba
Pan American Games silver medalists for Cuba
Pan American Games bronze medalists for Cuba
Pan American Games medalists in judo
Judoka at the 1975 Pan American Games
Judoka at the 1979 Pan American Games
Medalists at the 1975 Pan American Games
Medalists at the 1979 Pan American Games
20th-century Cuban people
21st-century Cuban people